Kirill Vladimirovich Veselov is a Russian ski-orienteering competitor and world champion. He won a gold medal in the relay event at the World Ski Orienteering Championships in Moscow in 2007, together with Andrei Gruzdev and Eduard Khrennikov, and received a silver medal in the long course and a bronze medal in the middle distance.

References

Living people
Russian orienteers
Male orienteers
Ski-orienteers
1983 births
Sportspeople from Tomsk